Mulchera is a Village and a tehsil located in the Gadchiroli district in the Indian state of Maharashtra.

Demographics 
As per Indian givernment census of 2011, the population of Mulchera taluka was 45787.

References

External links
 Mulchera village map at Maharashtra Remote Sensing Application Centre

Cities and towns in Gadchiroli district
Talukas in Maharashtra